George Nuah Gibson (born 17 August 2000) is a Norwegian footballer who plays for PO Xylotymbou.

From Tønsberg, he started his youth career with IL Flint before joining Sandefjord's youth system in summer 2016. In 2018, he made his senior first-team debut, being Sandefjord's first player born in the 2000s, and was also selected for Norway's youth national team. He left Sandefjord after the 2020 season and subsequently joined Norwegian Second Division club Øygarden. He only made seven appearances for Øygarden before moving to Florø in August 2021. In the winter of 2022 he moved abroad, to Cypriot second-tier side PO Xylotymbou.

References

2000 births
Living people
Sportspeople from Tønsberg
Norwegian people of Ghanaian descent
Norwegian footballers
Eliteserien players
Norwegian First Division players
Norwegian Second Division players
Sandefjord Fotball players
Øygarden FK players
Florø SK players
Association football forwards
Norway youth international footballers
Norwegian expatriate footballers
Expatriate footballers in Cyprus
Norwegian expatriate sportspeople in Cyprus